The Zoo Taiping (English: 'Taiping Zoo') is a zoological park located at Bukit Larut, Taiping, Perak, Malaysia. Established in 1961, is the only zoo in northern Malaysia.

It is one of the major zoological parks in Malaysia. The zoo . In 2003, the zoo established a night safari, opening again at nighttime hours.

Animals
The zoo has a collection of 1500 animals from 140 species. It also houses the largest number of stump-tailed macaques in Malaysia, which is thirteen, compared to six at Zoo Negara and five at Malacca Zoo.

Some of the animals in the zoo include:

Mammals

African lion
Agile wallaby
Asian elephant
Asian golden cat
Asian palm civet
Asian small-clawed otter
Asiatic brush-tailed porcupine
Axis deer
Banded palm civet
Bawean deer
Binturong
Bornean bearded pig
Bornean orangutan
Chimpanzee
Clouded leopard
Common eland
Common marmoset
Dhole
Gaur
Giraffe
Hippopotamus
Indian muntjac
Indochinese leopard
Island flying fox
Large flying fox
Large Indian civet
Lechwe
Lesser mouse-deer
Mainland serow
Malayan porcupine
Malayan tapir
Malayan tiger
Marbled cat
Nilgai
Nyala
Plains zebra
Red-handed tamarin
Sambar deer
Serval
Siamang
Smooth-coated otter
Southern white rhinoceros
Spectral tarsier
Stump-tailed macaque
Sun bear
Sunda slow loris
White-handed gibbon
Wild boar

Birds

African spoonbill
Barred eagle-owl
Baya weaver
Black swan
Blue-and-yellow macaw
Blue-crowned hanging parrot
Budgerigar
Buffy fish owl
Cattle egret
Common hill myna
Common ostrich
Demoiselle crane
Emu
Eurasian griffon vulture
Greater flamingo
Green peafowl
Grey crowned crane
Lesser whistling duck
Milky stork
Mute swan
Nicobar pigeon
Red junglefowl
Scarlet ibis
Southern cassowary
Spotted wood owl
Striated heron
Trumpeter swan
White-headed munia
Whooper swan

Reptiles
African spurred tortoise
Dwarf crocodile
False gharial
Reticulated python
Rhinoceros iguana
Saltwater crocodile

Fish
African sharptooth catfish
Arapaima
Giant snakehead
Mozambique tilapia
Tinfoil barb

References

External links 

Buildings and structures in Perak
Taiping, Perak
Tourist attractions in Perak
Zoos established in 1961
Zoos in Malaysia